Pinkilluni (Quechua pinkillu a kind of flute, Aymara -ni a suffix to indicate ownership, "the one with a pinkillu", Hispanicized spelling Pinquillone) is a mountain in the Andes of Peru, about  high. It is located in the Puno Region, Sandia Province, Patambuco District. It lies north of the mountain Huch'uy Pinkilluni ("little Pinkilluni", Uchuy Pinquillone) and northeast of Hatun Pinkilluni.

References 

Mountains of Puno Region
Mountains of Peru